Equality Township is one of ten townships in Gallatin County, Illinois, USA.  As of the 2010 census, its population was 849 and it contained 416 housing units.

Geography

Cities, towns, villages
 Equality

Unincorporated towns
 Lawler at 
(This list is based on USGS data and may include former settlements.)

Cemeteries
The township contains these four cemeteries: Elmwood, Equality Village, Hickory Hill Catholic and Level Hill.

Major highways
  Illinois Route 1
  Illinois Route 13
  Illinois Route 142

Rivers
 Saline River

Demographics

School districts
 Gallatin Community Unit School District 7

Political districts
 Illinois' 19th congressional district
 State House District 118
 State Senate District 59

References
 
 United States Census Bureau 2007 TIGER/Line Shapefiles
 United States National Atlas

External links
 Equality township on City-Data.com
 Illinois State Archives

Townships in Gallatin County, Illinois
Townships in Illinois